Admiral Sir Timothy Peter Fraser,  is a retired senior Royal Navy officer who served as Vice-Chief of the Defence Staff from May 2019 to August 2022.

Early life
Fraser was educated at Lord Williams's School, a comprehensive school in Thame, Oxfordshire.

Naval career
Fraser joined the Royal Navy in 1982 and was commissioned a sub-lieutenant on 1 January 1984. He captained the patrol craft  from 1989 to 1991, and served as captain of the destroyer  from 1997 to 1998 and of the destroyer  from 2001 to 2003. In the latter he was also commander of the 5th Destroyer Squadron. Fraser was appointed captain of the aircraft carrier  in 2006, and Director of Naval Plans and resources at the Ministry of Defence in 2007. He went on to be Commander, UK Maritime Component, Bahrain in 2010.

Promoted to rear admiral on 16 January 2012, Fraser became Senior British Advisor, United States Central Command in 2012, and Assistant Chief of Defence Staff (Capability & Force Design) at the Ministry of Defence in 2014. He was appointed Companion of the Order of the Bath (CB) in the 2015 Birthday Honours. Promoted to vice admiral on 26 June 2017, Fraser was appointed Chief of Joint Operations that month. He was promoted to admiral and succeeded General Sir Gordon Messenger as Vice-Chief of the Defence Staff in May 2019.

Fraser was appointed Knight Commander of the Order of the Bath (KCB) in the 2020 Birthday Honours.

Fraser stepped down in August 2022 when General Gwyn Jenkins succeeded him as Vice-Chief of the Defence Staff. He retired from the navy on 1 December 2022.

References

|-

Living people
Royal Navy admirals
Knights Commander of the Order of the Bath
Year of birth missing (living people)
People educated at Lord Williams's School